, also known as Higashionna West, was a Ryukyuan martial artist who founded a fighting style known at the time as Naha-te.  He is recognized as one of the first students of Fujian White Crane Kung Fu masters, namely Ryū Ryū Ko, in the Fuzhou region of China who returned with those skills to Okinawa.  His student, Chōjun Miyagi, would later found Gōjū ryū Karate.

Early life
Higaonna was born in Nishimura, Naha to a merchant family, whose business was selling goods to the north of Okinawa and shipping firewood back to Naha. Firewood was an expensive commodity in the Ryukyu Islands.  His family belonged to the lower Shizoku class known as the Chikudun Peichin.

The characters of his family name (東恩納) are pronounced "Higaonna" in Okinawan, and "Higashionna" in Japanese.  In Western articles the two spellings are often used interchangeably. He had an older relative, 5 years older, called Higaonna Kanryu who lived in Higashimura and was known as "Higashionna East".

Martial arts
In 1867, Higaonna began to study Monk Fist Boxing (Luohan Quan) from Aragaki Tsuji Pechin Seisho who was a fluent Chinese speaker and interpreter for the Ryūkyūan court. At that time the word karate was not in common use, and the martial arts were often referred to simply as Te ("hand"), sometimes prefaced by the area of origin, as Nafaa-Ti, Shui-Ti, or simply Uchinaa-Ti.

In September 1870, with the help of Yoshimura Udun Chomei (an Aji or prince), Higaonna gained the travel permit necessary to travel to Fuzhou, on the pretext of going to Beijing as a translator for Okinawan officials. There are records which show that in March 1873 he sailed to Fuzhou in the Fukien province of China. although this may have been a later trip to Fuzhou because accounts passed on by Chojun Miyagi refer to an earlier year of departure in 1870.

Aragaki had given Higaonna an introduction to the martial arts master Kojo Taitei whose dojo was in Fuzhou. Higaonna spent his time studying with various teachers of the Chinese martial arts, the first four years he probably studied with Wai Xinxian, Kojo Tatai and or Iwah at the Kojo Dojo. Kanryo then trained under a man referred to as Ryū Ryū Ko, but his name was never recorded as Kanryo Higaonna was illiterate. According to oral account, Kanryo spent years doing household chores for master Ryū Ryū Ko, until he saved his daughter from drowning during a heavy flood and begged the master to teach Kung Fu as a reward.

In the 1880s, after Ryūkyū was annexed by Japan, Kanryo returned to Okinawa and continued the family business.  He also began to teach the martial arts in and around Naha. He began by teaching the sons of Yoshimura Udun Chomei. His style was distinguished by its integration of both go-no (hard) and ju-no (soft) techniques in one system.  He became so prominent that the name "Naha-te" became identified with Higaonna Kanryo's system. He travelled to China several times thereafter. His last visit was in 1898 when he escorted Yoshimura Chomei and two of his sons to Fuzhou. History records that they were blown off-course to Zhejiang and travelled by land to Fuzhou with an escort provided by the local Zhejiang authorities.

He began to teach Naha-te to the public in 1905 in the Naha Commercial School.

Kanryo was noted for his powerful Sanchin kata, or form. Students reported that the wooden floor would be hot from the gripping of his feet.

Legacy
Several of Kanryo's students went on to become influential masters of what came to be called karate, amongst them Chōjun Miyagi, Kenwa Mabuni, Kyoda Shigehatsu, Koki Shiroma, Higa Seiko, Tsuyoshi Chitose and Shiroma Shinpan (Gusukuma).

See also
 Pechin

References

External links 
  Akari-ki Karate: Higashionna
 History of Kanryo Higaonna at glenridgemartialarts.com
 History of Goju-ryu

1853 births
1916 deaths
Okinawan male karateka
People from Naha
19th-century Ryukyuan people
20th-century Ryukyuan people